Stephen Craigie (born 19 June 1990) is an English former professional snooker player from Newcastle. As a junior, he won a number of tournaments and he secured his place on the Main Tour for the first time in the 2008–2009 season by winning the European Under-19 Championship.

However, he was unable to retain his place, his season culminating in a 10–5 defeat to Lee Spick in the first qualifying round of the World Championship.

Craigie's younger brother Sam is also a professional snooker player.

Performance and rankings timeline

Career finals

Pro-am finals: 4

Amateur finals: 1 (1 title)

References

External links
 Player Profile on World Snooker 
 Profile on Pro Snooker Blog

English snooker players
Living people
1990 births
Sportspeople from Newcastle upon Tyne
Competitors at the 2009 World Games